Nowa Iwiczna (pronounced ) is a village in the administrative district of Gmina Lesznowola, within Piaseczno County, Masovian Voivodeship, in east-central Poland.

The village has a population of 3755 as per 2011 (Narodowy Spis Powszechny 2011) - source.

References

Nowa Iwiczna